Nikolai Solomonovich Martynov (1815–1875) was the Russian army officer who fatally shot the poet Mikhail Lermontov in a cliff-edge duel on July 27, 1841, despite Lermontov's supposedly having made it known that he was going to shoot into the air.

References

External links
 
 
Brief Biography of Lermontov at faculty.virginia.edu with mention of the duel 

1815 births
1875 deaths
Mikhail Lermontov
Imperial Russian Army personnel
Russian duellists
Russian military personnel of the Caucasian War